Edward Hodges Baily  (10 March 1788 – 22 May 1867; sometimes misspelled Bailey) was a prolific English sculptor responsible for numerous public monuments, portrait busts, statues and exhibition pieces as well as works in silver. He carved friezes for both the Marble Arch and Buckingham Palace in London. His numerous statues of public figures include that of Horatio Nelson on top of Nelson's Column and Charles Grey, 2nd Earl Grey on Grey's Monument in Newcastle upon Tyne. Throughout his career Baily was responsible for creating a number of monuments and memorials for British churches and cathedrals, including several in St Paul's Cathedral.

Biography
Baily was born in 1788 at Downend in Bristol to Martha Hodges (1755-1836) and William Hillier Baily (1763-1834), a woodcutter who specialised in carving ship's figureheads. At the age of fourteen he was placed as an accounts clerk in a mercantile house, where he worked for two years, though he continued to produce wax models and busts, his childhood hobby. In 1804, aged sixteen he abandoned his job and set himself up as a professional wax portraitist. Two Homeric studies, executed for a friend, were shown to the sculptor John Flaxman who was so impressed, that in 1807, he accepted Baily as a pupil in his London studio and subsequently employed him as an assistant. In 1808 Baily won the silver medal of the Society of Arts for a plaster figure of Laocoön and the next year entered the Royal Academy Schools. At the academy he won a silver medal in 1809 and in 1811 he gained their gold medal for a model of Hercules restoring Alcestis to Admetus, and soon after exhibited Apollo discharging his Arrows against the Greeks and Hercules casting Lichas into the Sea. 

From 1816 to 1846 Baily was the Chief Modeller for Rundell, Bridge and Rundell, goldsmiths to the royal family, where he was responsible for creating the Doncaster Cup trophy in 1843 and the Ascot Gold Cup in 1844. Baily also produced designs for the silversmith Paul Storr. For a soup tureen commission in 1821, Baily designed a pair of ornamental handles which became the basis of his large scale marble sculpture Eve at the Fountain, which was acquired by the Bristol Literary Institute and is now in the Bristol Museum & Art Gallery. Widely reproduced at reduced sizes in both Parian ware and bronze, the work was among the most popular individual sculptures in Britain at the time. Baily returned to Eve as a subject in 1842 with the work Eve listening to the Voice. Baily was elected an Associate member of the Royal Academy in 1817 and, on the strength of Eve at the Fountain, a full Academician in 1821.

From the 1820s until 1858 Baily had a series of high-profile public commissions and was also responsible for numerous portrait busts, statues and exhibition pieces. He carved the bas-reliefs on the facade of the Masonic Hall on Park Street in Bristol and those on the south side of the Marble Arch in Hyde Park in 1826. When changes were made to the size and design of the Marble Arch, a number of friezes that Baily had carved were considered surplus to requirements but were installed on the facade of Buckingham Palace. He also designd the models of the stone figures installed on the pediment of Buckingham Palace when the building was enlarged and carved the frieze Britannia Rewarding Arts and Sciences for the Palace's throne room.
He created the prominent statue of Horatio Nelson for the top of Nelson's Column, in Trafalgar Square. For the facade of the National Gallery facing onto Trafalgar Square he created a series of statues and friezes.

Baily exhibited at the Royal Academy regularly from 1810 to 1862 and at the British Institution from 1812 to 1840.  His exhibition pieces often represented aspects of family life with titles such as Maternal Affection and Mother and Child. For Saint Stephen's Hall in the Palace of Westminster he created statues of Charles James Fox and Lord Mansfield. Subjects of his portrait busts included the Duke of Wellington, his mentor John Flaxman and Lord Byron. Several of his designs for monuments were cast as small scales bronzes for the domestic retail market, notably his equestrian statue of George IV.

Financial insecurity was a recurring theme in Baily's life. He was first declared bankrupt in 1831, and again in 1838. On the first occasion questions were asked in Parliament on his behalf because his financial distress had resulted from delays in receiving payment for sculptures at Buckingham Palace. Fortunately his appeals to the Royal Academy for financial assistance, were successful in the 1830s, as again in the 1860s, when they provided him with a pension of £200 a year as an honorary retired Academician. Baily's election as a fellow of the Royal Society (FRS) came in 1842. Among his final works was the design for the Turner medal in 1857, the Royal Academy's award for landscape painting.

Baily married Elizabeth Wardley (1786-1836) in Bristol during 1806 and the couple had four children. Their daughter, Caroline, married Edgar George Papworth Senior one of Baily's assistants. Among his other assistants and pupils were John Henry Foley, Musgrave Watson, Joseph Durham, Edward Bowring Stephens and William Theed.  Baily's nephew was William Hellier Baily, the paleontologist.  
 
Baily died at 99 Devonshire Road, Holloway in north London on 22 May 1867 and is buried in the city's Highgate Cemetery.

Selected public works

1815-1829

1830-1839

1840-1849

1850 and later

Church monuments and memorials
Throughout his career Baily was responsible for creating a number of monuments and memorials for British churches and cathedrals. Examples include

 A tablet with two marble full-length angels, to Samuel Paynter, of Richmond at St Mary Magdalene, Richmond.
 Several memorials in the Church of St Nicholas, Lintn Hill, Maidstone, at St James, Uttoxeter Road, Stoke-on-Trent and at St John the Baptist, Devizes
 Memorial with kneeling female figure, Church of the Holy Trinity, Ardington, Oxfordshire
 Memorials to Peter Denys, died 1816, and to Lady Charlotte Denys, died 1835, Church of St Mary, Easton Neston, Northamptonshire
 Two memorials, to Benjamin Newcombe (1818) and to George Gostling (1854) in Church of St John the Baptist, Egham High Street
 Memorial plaque to A Walker Heneage, died 1828, in the Church of St Swithin, Compton Bassett
 Memorial tablet for Elizabeth Bell (1829), Church of St James, Lincolnshire
 Large memorial to J. Spearing, died 1831, Church of St Mary, Potterne, Wiltshire
 Memorials to John Ogle, died 1831, and to Sara Ogle, died 1846, in the Church of Saint Mary Magdalene, Whalton
 Memorial, with medallion bust, to Bishop John Jebb, died 1833, in the Church of the Holy Trinity, Clapham Common,London
 A chancel wall plaque 1836, Church of St Andrew, Heddington, Wiltshire
 Wall monument to Thomas Botfield, died 1843, Church of St Michael, Hopton Wafers, Shropshire
 A memorial with carved figure, 1846, Church of St Mary, Hertfordshire
 A sculpture group memorial to John Thackeray, died 1851, Church of St Mary the Virgin, Lewisham High Street, London

Other works
 Lord Byron, 1826, Harrow School; and Newstead Abbey, Nottinghamshire
 Michael Faraday, 1830, University Museum, Oxford
 Philip John Miles, Holy Trinity, Abbots Leigh
 Richard Owen, 1846, Royal College of Surgeons
 Sir John Herschel, 1850, St. John's College, Cambridge
 Busts of Thomas Bewick and Sir James Knott   – Literary and Philosophical Society of Newcastle upon Tyne
 Eve listening to Adam – Victoria and Albert Museum, London
 Charles Metcalfe, 1st Baron Metcalfe, a marble bust from 1844 in the Victoria Memorial, Kolkata
 Justice – Old Council House, Bristol
 Five statues in niches representing Christ and the Evangelists, after originals by Bertel Thorvaldsen, in the Church of St Margaret at Grittleton, Wiltshire.

References

Further reading

External links

 Works in the National Portrait Gallery collection

1788 births
1867 deaths
19th-century English sculptors
19th-century English male artists
Artists from Bristol
Burials at Highgate Cemetery
English male sculptors
Fellows of the Royal Society
Royal Academicians